Rančić is a South Slavic surname. Notable people with the surname include:

 Branimir Rančić (born 1953), Serbian medical doctor and politician
 Damir Rančić (born 1983), Croatian basketball player
 Bill Rancic (born 1971), American entrepreneur, husband of Giuliana Rancic
 Giuliana Rancic (born 1974), Italian-American television personality and journalist, wife of Bill Rancic

See also
Rančić Family House, Grocka, Belgrade, Serbia 

Croatian surnames